The Cord of Life is a 1909 American silent short drama film directed by D. W. Griffith. A print of the film exists in the film archive of the Library of Congress.

Cast
 Charles Inslee as Galora
 Marion Leonard as Galora's Wife
 George Gebhardt as Antonine
 Linda Arvidson as In Tenement
 Dorothy Bernard
 Clara T. Bracy
 John R. Cumpson as In Tenement
 Charles K. French
 Charles Gorman
 Guy Hedlund
 Anita Hendrie as In Tenement
 Arthur V. Johnson as Policeman
 Florence Lawrence as In Tenement
 Adolph Lestina
 David Miles as In Tenement
 Gertrude Robinson as On Street
 Mack Sennett as Policeman
 Harry Solter as On Street
 Dorothy West as In Tenement

References

External links
 

1909 films
1909 drama films
1909 short films
Silent American drama films
American silent short films
American black-and-white films
Films directed by D. W. Griffith
1900s American films
American drama short films